Candriam, a subsidiary of New York Life, is a global multi-specialist asset management firm. By 30 June 2021, Candriam had 150 billion euros of assets under management (AUM).

Founded in 1998, Candriam manages investments focused on responsible investing across a range of asset classes including fixed income, equities, alternatives, asset allocation, and real estate.

Candriam is headquartered in Luxembourg with offices in Brussels, Paris, and London, and client representatives throughout Europe, the Middle East, Asia and the United States.

Candriam has been led by Naïm Abou-Jaoudé as Chief Executive Officer14 (CEO) since 2007. He has been at the company since its founding in 1996.

History 
The company was founded as Dexia Asset Management, a branch of Dexia S.A, in 1996. Following its acquisition by New York Life Investments in February 2014, the company changed its name to Candriam, which stands for “Conviction AND Responsibility In Asset Management”, representing two of the company’s core values.

The company received the award of “European Asset Manager of the Year” for two years in a row in 2015 and 2016 and was listed among MacKay Williams’s top ranking for future leading names in asset management in 2016.

In 2018 the company successfully acquired a 40% equity stake in London-based real estate manager Tristan Capital Partners, as well as ABN-Amro’s direct management unit, representing €8bn in AUM.

In September 2019 the company announced it was carbon-neutral with all carbon emissions generated being offset. Including scope 1 (fuel, mainly vehicles), scope 2 emissions (energy for buildings) plus business travel as well as supplier related emissions (as part of scope 3).

In June 2020, the company signed an agreement to transfer Rothschild & Co Asset Management Europe’s alternative multi-asset management business to Candriam. The transaction concerns open-ended funds domiciled in France and Luxembourg and dedicated institutional funds, representing total assets under management of almost 350 million euros.

Social Responsible Investments (SRI) 
Candriam has been a pioneer in Sustainable and Responsible Investments (SRI) since 1996. The company states that investment opportunities and risks can’t be fully evaluated using traditional financial measures alone and that Environmental, Social and Governance (ESG) criteria should be taken into consideration.

Candriam’s social responsibility engagement aims to go beyond investments. The company is actively focused on raising awareness and advancing the global investment industry’s commitment to a sustainable and inclusive economy.

In 2017, Candriam launched the Candriam Academy, the world’s first free-to-access accredited training platform for sustainable and responsible investing. In June 2020 the platform passed 4,000 members. The platform is aimed at raising awareness, promoting education and improving knowledge of financial intermediaries on SRI.

Candriam has also partnered with a number of institutions across Europe with the aim of advancing awareness and action on climate change:

In 2016, Candriam launched a Master in Management of Sustainable development Goals with Lumsa Università in Rome.

In October 2019 Candriam and Kedge Business School created a research chair dedicated to sustainable finance.

In June 2020 Candriam announced its partnership with the London School of Economics and Political Science (LSE) to develop the Sustainability, Investment, Inclusion and Impact (SI3) initiative, focused on developing research, improve communication and promote the exchange of ideas on climate action that delivers positive social impact. 

In 2019, Candriam announced a sponsorship deal with Forest Green Rovers. Forest Green Rovers  was named as the world’s first UN certified carbon-neutral football club in 2018. Candriam is the football club’s official financial partner.

In June 2019, Candriam launched the industry’s first actively managed carbon neutral climate action fund, aimed at investing in companies that provide long-term climate change solutions.

In 2019, Candriam launched the industry’s first oncology fund, aimed at investing in listed companies that research and develop products for the treatment of cancer.

In June 2020, Candriam launched a circular economy fund aimed at investing in companies that provide new technologies and innovate solutions to help businesses decrease resource dependence and waste.  

A UN PRI early signatory in 2006, Candriam has signed the main global statements and initiatives with the investment community to call on stakeholders to act responsibly.

References

Candriam